Aneurys Zabala (born December 21, 1996) is a Dominican professional baseball pitcher in the Detroit Tigers organization. He has played in Major League Baseball (MLB) for the Miami Marlins.

Career

Seattle Mariners
Zabala was signed by the Seattle Mariners as an international free agent on April 30, 2014. He made his professional debut with the DSL Mariners, recording a 1-6 record and 4.33 ERA in 14 games (12 of them starts). The following year, Zabala made 14 appearances for the Arizona League Mariners, struggling to a 2-2 record and 6.56 ERA with 21 strikeouts in 23.1 innings pitched. In 2016, Zabala made 16 appearances for the AZL Mariners, improving his ERA to 2.88 while striking out 28 in 25.0 innings pitched.

Los Angeles Dodgers
On March 1, 2017, Zabala and Drew Jackson were traded to the Los Angeles Dodgers in exchange for Chase De Jong. Zabala spent the year split between the Arizona League Dodgers, and the Single-A Great Lakes Loons, accumulating a 4-2 record and 7.66 ERA with 25 strikeouts in 24.2 innings pitched.

He was assigned to Great Lakes to begin the 2018 season. In 24 games, he pitched to a 2-2 record and 4.86 ERA with 30 strikeouts in 37.0 innings of work

Cincinnati Reds
On July 4, 2018, Zabala and James Marinan were traded to the Cincinnati Reds in exchange for Dylan Floro, Zach Neal, and international bonus pool money. He finished the year with the Single-A Dayton Dragons, posting an 0-3 record and 3.31 ERA with 3 saves and 13 strikeouts in 16.1 innings pitched.

In 2019, Zabala spent the year with the High-A Daytona Tortugas. Appearing in 39 contests, he recorded a 1-2 record and 5.63 ERA with 48 strikeouts in 54.1 innings pitched. Zabala did not play in a game in 2020 due to the cancellation of the minor league season because of the COVID-19 pandemic.

Philadelphia Phillies
On December 31, 2020, Zabala signed a minor league contract with the Philadelphia Phillies organization. He was assigned to the High-A Jersey Shore BlueClaws to begin the 2021 season. He made 33 total appearances split between Jersey Shore and the Double-A Reading Fightin Phils, pitching to a cumulative 3-5 record and 6.75 ERA with 63 strikeouts in 42.2 innings pitched. He became a free agent following the season.

Miami Marlins
On December 1, 2021, Zabala signed a minor league contract with the Miami Marlins organization. He was assigned to the Double-A Pensacola Blue Wahoos to begin the 2022 season.

On June 11, 2022, Zabala was selected to the 40-man roster and promoted to the major leagues for the first time. He made his debut on June 12, against the Houston Astros. He pitched 0.2 innings, with a hit and a strikeout. He was designated for assignment on June 13, 2022. He cleared waivers and was sent outright to Double-A Pensacola on June 16.

He had his contract selected on August 1, 2022 and was designated for assignment on August 6. On August 8, Zabala cleared waivers and was sent outright to the Triple-A Jacksonville Jumbo Shrimp. He had his contract selected again on September 12, 2022, as the 29th man for a double-header but was designated for assignment in between games. He elected free agency on October 6, 2022.

Detroit Tigers
On January 7, 2023, Zabala signed a minor league deal with the Detroit Tigers.

See also
 List of Major League Baseball players from the Dominican Republic

References

External links

Living people
1996 births
Major League Baseball players from the Dominican Republic
Major League Baseball pitchers
Miami Marlins players
Dominican Summer League Mariners players
Arizona League Mariners players
Arizona League Dodgers players
Great Lakes Loons players
Dayton Dragons players
Daytona Tortugas players
Jersey Shore BlueClaws players
Reading Fightin Phils players
Pensacola Blue Wahoos players
Jacksonville Jumbo Shrimp players